The Oxford Book of Modern Verse 1892–1935 was a poetry anthology edited by W. B. Yeats, and published in 1936 by Oxford University Press. A long and interesting introductory essay starts from the proposition that the poets included should be all the 'good' ones (implicitly the field is Anglo-Irish poetry, though notably a few Indian poets are there) active since Tennyson's death. In fact the poets chosen by Yeats are notable as an idiosyncratic selection to represent modern verse. The Victorians are much represented, while the war poets from World War I are not. The modernist tendency does not predominate, though it is not ignored; Georgian Poetry is covered quite thoroughly, while a Dublin wit like Oliver St. John Gogarty is given much space and praised in the introduction as a great poet.

Yeats was influenced by his personal feelings.  Gogarty was a personal friend; he also included poems by Margot Ruddock, with whom he was having a relationship, and other friends such as Shri Purohit Swami.  He notes that Rudyard Kipling and Ezra Pound are under-represented because paying their royalties would have cost too much.  People have regretted that he did not say which poems he would have added given a free hand.

Poets in the Oxford Book of Modern Verse 1892-1935

Lascelles Abercrombie
W. H. Auden
George Barker
Julian Bell
Hilaire Belloc
Laurence Binyon
Edmund Blunden
Wilfrid Scawen Blunt
Gordon Bottomley
Thomas Boyd
Robert Bridges
Rupert Brooke
Joseph Campbell
Roy Campbell
G. K. Chesterton
Richard Church
Mary Elizabeth Coleridge
Padraic Colum
Alfred Edgar Coppard
Frances Cornford
William Henry Davies
Edward Davison
Walter de la Mare
Ernest Dowson
John Drinkwater

T. S. Eliot
Edwin John Ellis
William Empson
Michael Field
James Elroy Flecker
John Freeman
Manmohan Ghose
Wilfrid Gibson
Oliver St. John Gogarty
Augusta, Lady Gregory
Julian Grenfell
Thomas Hardy
William Ernest Henley
Frederick Robert Higgins
Ralph Hodgson
Gerard Manley Hopkins
A. E. Housman
Richard Hughes
Lionel Johnson
James Joyce
Rudyard Kipling
D. H. Lawrence

Cecil Day-Lewis
Hugh M'Diarmid
Thomas MacGreevy
Louis MacNeice
Charles Madge
John Masefield
Edward Powys Mathers
Alice Meynell
Harold Monro
Thomas Sturge Moore
Henry Newbolt
Robert Nichols
Frank O'Connor
Walter Pater
Vivian de Sola Pinto
William Plomer
Ezra Pound
Frederick York Powell
Herbert Read
Ernest Rhys
Michael Roberts
Thomas William Hazen Rolleston
Margot Ruddock
George William Russell
Victoria Sackville-West

Siegfried Sassoon
Geoffrey Scott
Edward Shanks
Edith Sitwell
Sacheverell Sitwell
Stephen Spender
J. C. Squire
William Force Stead
James Stephens
Leonard Strong
Frank Pearce Sturm
Shri Purohit Swami
Arthur Symons
John Millington Synge
Rabindranath Tagore
Edward Thomas
Francis Thompson
Herbert Trench
Walter James Turner
Arthur Waley
Sylvia Townsend Warner
Dorothy Wellesley
Oscar Wilde
W. B. Yeats

1936 poetry books
British poetry anthologies
Modern Verse 1892-1935, Oxford Book of
W. B. Yeats